Mamak is a metropolitan district of Ankara Province in the Central Anatolia region of Turkey, part of the city of Ankara.

Public buildings include; the military prison, the subject of legend, poem and song; the military electronic surveillance centre; and Ankara's largest rubbish dump.

Demographics

Neighbourhoods 

There are 66 neighbourhoods in Mamak as of 2017.

Notable natives
 Kübra Öztürk (born 1991), Woman Grandmaster of chess
 Mustafa Yılmaz (born 1992), Grandmaster of chess

Notes

References

External links
 District governor's official website 
 District municipality's official website 

 
Populated places in Ankara Province
Districts of Ankara Province